Bai Hotel Cebu (stylized as bai Hotel Cebu) is a 668-room capacity hotel in Mandaue, Cebu. It is the largest hotel in the Visayas by room capacity.

History
The hotel started operations after its soft opening on September 27, 2017. By October 2018, all of its 668 rooms were ready and the grand opening for the hotel was held on November 23 of the same year.

Facilities
Bai Hotel Cebu occupies a lot spanning  and has 668 room sorted under ten classifications. The hotel building itself is 23-storeys high. It also hosts the Lapu Lapu Ballroom, an events venue.

Management
Bai Global Properties Group manages Bai Hotel Cebu. The hotel is a member of WorldHotels, an international group of independent hotels, since April 9, 2016.

References

Hotels in Cebu
Buildings and structures in Mandaue
Hotel buildings completed in 2017
Hotels established in 2017